Green Lake is a lake located by Preble, New York. Fish species present in the lake include largemouth bass, pickerel, and pumpkinseed sunfish. There is access via channel from Upper Little York Lake.

References

Lakes of New York (state)
Lakes of Cortland County, New York